Hennepin County Road 61 or County State-Aid Highway 61 (CR 61, CSAH 61) is a  major route along the east side of Interstate 494 (I-494) in Hennepin County, Minnesota. The route travels through the west suburbs of the Twin Cities through Maple Grove, Plymouth, Minnetonka, Hopkins and Eden Prairie.

Route Description 
Hennepin County Road 61 goes by many names. From its northern junction with CR 130 in Maple Grove, County Road 61 (CR 61) is also known as Hemlock Lane, with an interchange at I-94. Just north of its junction with CR 10 (Bass Lake Road) and the boundary with Plymouth it becomes Northwest Boulevard and continues under that name until its junction with State Highway 55 (MN 55), intersecting with CR 47 (Pineview Lane North) and CR 9 (Rockford Road). Between MN 55 and the boundary with Minnetonka it is known as Xenium Lane, intersecting with CR 6. Between the Minnetonka boundary and CR 5 (Minnetonka Boulevard), it is known as Plymouth Road, intersecting with I-394 and Cedar Lake Road. South of Minnetonka Boulevard, it changes names again to Shady Oak Road and continues into Eden Prairie, intersecting with MN 7, MN 62 and ends at US Highway 212 (US 212), but Shady Oak Road itself continues for a short distance into the "Golden Triangle" area of Eden Prairie and ends at Valley View Road. Once US 212 was shifted onto its new freeway alignment in 2008 through Eden Prairie and Chaska, the old alignment (Flying Cloud Drive) took on the designation of CR 61 continuing to the county line with Carver County.

History
CR 61 was authorized and paved during the 1960s, making an alternate route for nearby I-494, intersecting with many of the same routes route I-494 did, such as I-94, MN 7, MN 55, MN 62, CR 9, CR 10, CR 5 and several others, in the western suburbs of the Twin Cities. 

In the 1980s, a new interchange was built at I-394, when the new freeway was being paved from Wayzata to downtown Minneapolis. In 2008, CR 61 was extended to the old alignment of U 212 (Flying Cloud Drive), to the Carver–Hennepin county line when US 212 was shifted onto the new MN 312 freeway and the 312 number, as a state highway, was retired.

Major Intersections

References

061
Eden Prairie, Minnesota
Minnetonka, Minnesota
Plymouth, Minnesota
Maple Grove, Minnesota